Vladimir Kotyrev (17 July 1931 – 2003) was a Soviet sprint canoer who competed in the early 1950s. At the 1952 Summer Olympics in Helsinki, he finished eighth in the C-1 1000 m.

References
Vladimir Kotyrev's profile at Sports Reference.com
Biography of Vladimir Kotyrev 

1931 births
2003 deaths
Canoeists at the 1952 Summer Olympics
Olympic canoeists of the Soviet Union
Soviet male canoeists
Russian male canoeists